The Himalayan Times is an English-language broadsheet newspaper published and distributed daily in Nepal. Rajan Pokhrel is the acting editor. In the annual newspaper classification report published by Press Council Nepal,it was placed in the A+ category, the highest possible rank.

The newspaper was founded on 23 November 2001. It is based in Maharajgunj, Kathmandu. It is owned by International Media Network Nepal (Pvt) Ltd which in turn is owned by a Nepali investors. The paper's competitors tried to organise and lobby against the entry of foreign-owned newspaper in the country, but were not successful.

At the time of its founding, it published in 12 pages, six of them coloured, and was priced as Rs 2. Within a year, it had become one of the premier English language dailies in Nepal, and claimed to be number one in terms of readership.

References

External links 
 
 

Daily newspapers published in Nepal
English-language newspapers published in Asia
Publications established in 2001

Online newspapers published in Nepal
2001 establishments in Nepal